Radio Moldova Tineret is a youth-oriented radio station, owned by the public broadcaster TRM. It's the first niche-oriented station from the public broadcaster, and its target audience is Moldovan youth. It was launched on 30 October 2012, at 6 o'clock in Bălți, transmitting live on 99.4 FM and on its website.

Radio Moldova Tineret will broadcast soon on these frequencies:
 Varniţa, Anenii Noi, pe frecvența 104.0 FM;
 Nisporeni - 103.8 FM;
 Copanca - 103.6 FM;
 Sărata-Galbenă - 107.1 FM.

See also 
 TeleRadio-Moldova
 Radio Moldova
 TV Moldova 1
 TV Moldova Internaţional

References

External links
 Radio Moldova Live

Publicly funded broadcasters
Romanian-language radio stations in Moldova
Teleradio-Moldova
Public radio stations in Moldova
Mass media in Bălți